Guglielmo Sirleto (or Sirleti) (1514 – 6 October 1585) was an Italian Cardinal and scholar. He was considered the greatest linguist of his age.

Sirleto was born at Guardavalle near Stilo in Calabria.  The son of a physician, he received an excellent education, made the acquaintance of distinguished scholars at Rome, and became an intimate friend of Cardinal Marcello Cervino, later Pope Marcellus II. He prepared for Cervino, who was President of the Council of Trent in its initial period, extensive reports on all the important questions presented for discussion. After his appointment as custodian of the Vatican Library, Sirleto drew up a complete descriptive catalogue of its Greek manuscripts and prepared a new edition of the Vulgate.

Pope Paul IV named him prothonotary and tutor to two of his nephews. After this pope's death he taught Greek and Hebrew at Rome, numbering Charles Borromeo among his students. There was talk of making him Pope, but it was considered that the drift of his mind was too much given to letters to permit him to run a strong, practical administration in those troubled times.

During the concluding period of the Council of Trent, he was, although he continued to reside at Rome, the adviser of the cardinal-legates. 

He was himself created cardinal in 1565 at the request of Charles Borromeo, became Bishop of San Marco in Calabria in 1566, and Bishop of Squillace in 1568. An order of the papal secretary of state, however, enjoined his residence at Rome, where he was named, in 1570, librarian of the Vatican Library.   This he enriched with many valuable texts on Greek, Latin and Oriental subjects.  His influence was paramount in the execution of the scientific undertakings decreed by the Council of Trent. 

He collaborated in the publication of the Roman Catechism, presided over the Commissions for the reform of Roman Breviary and Roman Missal, and directed the work of the new edition of the Roman Martyrology. Highly appreciative of Greek culture, he entertained all friendly relations with the East and encouraged all efforts tending to ecclesiastical reunion. 

His learning was such that he was reported to discourse in his sleep in Greek and Latin.  Latino Latini declared in a letter to Andreas Masius that he considered that Sirleto was equal in learning to all the others who worked on the Vulgate.

He was attended in his last illness by Philip Neri.  He died at Rome, and was buried in the presence of Pope Sixtus V.

He was a manuscript collector (e.g. Minuscule 373).

References
Hugo von Hurter, Nomenclator Lit., I (2nd ed., Innsbruck, 1892), 95-6
 Bäumer-Biron, Hist. du bréviaire, II (Paris, 1905), 169-71, passim.
 Andrew Edward Breen, A General and Critical Introduction to the Study of Holy Scripture 2nd edition (Rochester NY: John P. Smith Publishing Co. 1908).
 Nicola Taccone Gallucci, Monografia del cardinale Guglielmo Sirleto nel secolo decimosesto (Roma: Società tipografico-editrice romana, 1909).
 Georg Denzler, Kardinal Guglielmo Sirleto (1514-1585): Leben und Werk: Ein Beitrag zur nachtridentinischen Reform (München: M. Hueber, 1964) [Münchener theologische Studien: Historische Abteilung. Volume 17].
 Irena Backus and  Benoît Gain, Le Cardinal Guglielmo Sirleto: 1514-1585, sa bibliothèque et ses traductions de saint Basile (Roma: Ecole Française de Rome, 1986).

Notes

External links

1514 births
1585 deaths
16th-century Italian cardinals
People from the Vallata dello Stilaro
Italian librarians
16th-century Italian Roman Catholic bishops